Tarla Dalal (3 June 1936 – 6 November 2013) was an Indian food writer, chef,  cookbook author and host of cooking shows. Her first cook book, The Pleasures of Vegetarian Cooking, was published in 1974. Since then, she wrote over 100 books and sold more than 10million copies. She also ran the largest Indian food web site, and published a bi-monthly magazine, Cooking & More. Her cooking shows included  The  Tarla Dalal Show and Cook It Up With Tarla Dalal. Her recipes were published in about 25 magazines and tried in an estimated 120million Indian homes.

Though she wrote about many cuisines and healthy cooking, she specialized in Indian cuisine, particularly Gujarati cuisine. She was awarded the Padma Shri by Government of India in 2007, which made her the only Indian from the field of cooking to have been conferred the title. She was also awarded Women of the Year by Indian Merchants' Chamber in 2005.

She died on 6 November 2013 following a heart attack.

Early life
She was born and brought up in Pune, Maharashtra, India. In 1960, she married Nalin Dalal and relocated to Bombay (now Mumbai).

Career
Dalal started conducting cooking classes from her home in 1966, which led to the publication of her first cook book, The Pleasures of Vegetarian Cooking in 1974. The book has sold over 1.5 million copies. Over time, her popularity grew and she became a household name, with housewives and chefs swearing by her recipes.

Tarla Dalal is credited with introducing and popularizing foreign cuisines to the masses. She created vegetarian versions of a lot of non-vegetarian recipes from foreign lands. She revolutionized the cooking industry in India and is the most sold cookbook author in India.

Her books have been translated into numerous languages including Dutch, Russian, Hindi, Gujarati, Marathi and Bengali. She also published cooking magazines. In 2007, she started her 'Total Health Series' cookbook series.

Her range of ready-to-cook mixes, Tarla Dalal Mixes, was acquired by International Bestfoods Ltd. in 2000.

During the 2005 JAINA Convention in San Francisco, United States, she conducted cooking demonstrations together with Dr. Manoj Jain.

Dalal died at her residence on 6 November 2013 following a heart attack.

Personal life
Tarla Dalal had three children Sanjay, Deepak and Renu with her husband, Nalin, who died in 2005. She lived in an apartment on Napean Sea Road in South Mumbai.

Works
The Complete Gujarati Cook Book. Sanjay & Co, 1999. .
 Know your Flours. Sanjay & Co. .
 Italian Cookbook. Sanjay & Co, 2000. .
Healthy Breakfast. Sanjay & Co, 2003. .
 Sandwiches. Sanjay & Co, 2004. .
 Curries & Kadhis. Sanjay & Co, 2005. .
 Chips & Dips. Tarla Dalal, 2006. .
 Baked Dishes. Tarla Dalal, 2006. .
 Punjabi Khana. Sanjay & Co, 2007. .
 Delicious Diabetic Recipes: Low Calorie Cooking: Total Health Series. Sanjay & Co, 2002. .
 Jain Food: Compassionate and Healthy eating, with Manoj Jain and Laxmi Jain, MJain.net, 2005.

See also
 Indian cookbooks

References

External links
 Tarla Dalal, website
 
 
 

Indian food writers
Women cookbook writers
Indian television chefs
1936 births
2013 deaths
Gujarati people
Chefs of Indian cuisine
Vegetarian cookbook writers
Writers from Mumbai
Recipients of the Padma Shri in other fields
21st-century Indian Jains
Women chefs
Writers from Pune
Women writers from Maharashtra
20th-century Indian women writers
21st-century Indian women writers
21st-century Indian writers
20th-century Indian non-fiction writers
21st-century Indian non-fiction writers